Peak 8517 is the unofficial name of a  summit in the Saint Elias Mountains in Wrangell-St. Elias National Park and Preserve in Alaska, United States. The peak is also known as Bearhole Peak.  The prominent is  ranking it 100th on the list of prominent peaks in the United States.

See also

List of mountain peaks of Alaska
List of the most prominent summits of Alaska

References

Mountains of Alaska
Wrangell–St. Elias National Park and Preserve